Clemenceau may refer to:

 Georges Clemenceau (1841–1929), French statesman; leader in First World War
 Martine Clémenceau (born 1949), French singer
 Clemenceau-class aircraft carrier, a class of aircraft carriers of the French Navy
 Clemenceau (R 98), the lead ship of the class
 Clemenceau metro station, a Brussels metro station
 Mount Clemenceau, a mountain in the Canadian Rockies
 Rue Clémenceau, a commercial and residential street in Beirut, Lebanon
 Clemenceau, Arizona, a former smelter town
 Clemenceau, Saskatchewan, a hamlet in the Canadian province of Saskatchewan